Chromosome 19 open reading frame 33 is a protein that in humans is encoded by the C19orf33 gene.

Function

The protein encoded by this gene has been shown to be upregulated in SV40-immortalized fibroblasts as well as in endometrial carcinoma cells. The encoded protein is found primarily in the nucleus. This protein may play a role in placental development and diseases such as pre-eclampsia. Two transcript variants encoding different isoforms have been found for this gene. [provided by RefSeq, Dec 2015].

References

Further reading